The Southern Oceanic languages are a linkage (rather than family) of Oceanic languages spoken in Vanuatu and New Caledonia. It was proposed by John Lynch in 1995 and supported by later studies. It appears to be a linkage rather than a language family with a clearly defined internal nested structure.

Classification
Clark (2009) groups the North Vanuatu and Central Vanuatu languages together into a North–Central Vanuatu (NCV) group and also reconstructs Proto-North–Central Vanuatu, but this is not accepted by Lynch (2018).

In addition to the Reefs – Santa Cruz languages and the Meso-Melanesian languages of the western Solomon Islands, Geraghty (2017) notes that many Southern Oceanic languages are often lexically and typologically aberrant languages likely with Papuan substrata – particularly the Santo, Malakula, South Vanuatu, and New Caledonian languages, and perhaps also some Central Vanuatu languages of Ambrym and Efate. Nevertheless, languages in the eastern Solomon Islands, including Guadalcanal, Malaita, Makira, and adjacent islands, are much more conservative, and not as lexicaly aberrant as the Temotu languages and languages of the western Solomons.

Languages
Following Clark (2009) and Glottolog 4.0, four major groups can be delineated, which are North Vanuatu, Central Vanuatu, South Vanuatu, and New Caledonian. All four groups are linkages.

North Vanuatu
Torres–Banks
Espiritu Santo
(various others)
Central Vanuatu
Malakula
(various others)
South Vanuatu
New Caledonian

Lynch (1995)
Lynch (1995) tentatively grouped the languages as follows:

Banks–Torres family 
Northwest Santo family 
Southwest Santo family 
Sakao
East Santo family 
Ambae–Maewo family 
Nuclear Southern Oceanic linkage
Central Vanuatu linkage
Malekula Coastal
Malekula Interior
Pentecost
Ambrym–Paama
Epi–Efate
Epi
Shepherds–North Efate
South Efate – Southern Melanesian linkage
South Efate dialect network
Southern Melanesian family
Southern Vanuatu family
New Caledonian family

The non-nuclear branches are subsumed under Northern Vanuatu.

Ross, Pawley, & Osmond (2016)
Ross, Pawley, & Osmond (2016) propose the following internal classification for Southern Oceanic.

Southern Oceanic linkage
North Vanuatu linkage
Nuclear Southern Oceanic linkage
Central Vanuatu linkage
South Vanuatu languages
Loyalties-New Caledonia languages

See also
Languages of Vanuatu

References

Lynch, John, and Terry Crowley. 2001. Languages of Vanuatu: A New Survey and Bibliography. (Pacific Linguistics, 517.) Canberra: Research School of Pacific and Asian Studies, Australian National University.
Lynch, John, Malcolm Ross & Terry Crowley. 2002. The Oceanic languages. Richmond, Surrey: Curzon Press.
Clark, Ross. 2009. *Leo Tuai: A comparative lexical study of North and Central Vanuatu languages. Canberra: Pacific Linguistics (Research School of Pacific and Asian Studies, The Australian National University).

 
Central–Eastern Oceanic languages